Hubertus Martinus "Huub" Duyn (born 1 September 1984 in Onderdijk, North Holland) is a Dutch former racing cyclist, who rode professionally between 2006 and 2019 for the , , , , ,  and  teams. His best result in his career was winning the Paris–Tours Espoirs in 2006. He currently works as a directeur sportif for UCI Women's WorldTeam .

Major results

2006
 1st Paris–Tours Espoirs
 1st Stage 1 Ronde van Vlaams-Brabant
 2nd Memorial Van Coningsloo
 3rd Overall Le Triptyque des Monts et Châteaux
1st Stage 1
 3rd Overall Triptyque des Barrages
1st Stage 1
 3rd Grand Prix de Waregem
2007
 6th Overall Tour du Poitou-Charentes
2009
 1st Stage 1 (TTT) Tour of Qatar
2010
 4th Ronde Pévéloise
 5th Halle–Ingooigem
2011
 1st Stage 8 Crocodile Trophy (MTB)
 2nd Omloop Het Nieuwsblad Espoirs
 2nd Dwars door het Hageland
 4th Grote 1-MeiPrijs
 8th Internationale Wielertrofee Jong Maar Moedig
 9th Circuit de Wallonie
 10th Halle–Ingooigem
2012
 2nd Overall Ronde van Overijssel
 5th Grote Prijs Jef Scherens
 6th Grand Prix Criquielion
 7th Dwars door het Hageland
 10th Zellik–Galmaarden
2013
 1st Prologue (TTT) Volta a Portugal
 3rd Ronde van Limburg
 4th Grote Prijs Stad Geel
 6th Ringerike GP
 9th Overall Circuit des Ardennes
2014
 4th Arno Wallaard Memorial
 5th Overall Flèche du Sud
 5th Overall Tour Alsace
 6th Grote Prijs Stad Zottegem
 7th Overall Tour de Normandie
2015
 3rd Overall Tour de Luxembourg
 7th Grote Prijs Jef Scherens
 9th Overall Tour de Yorkshire
 9th Overall Tour of Belgium
 10th Druivenkoers Overijse
2016
 2nd Druivenkoers Overijse
 4th Grand Prix de Wallonie
 6th Volta Limburg Classic
 8th Overall Tour de Luxembourg
 10th Overall Tour des Fjords
2017
 1st Rad am Ring
 2nd Omloop Mandel-Leie-Schelde
 5th Overall Tour de Luxembourg
 5th Druivenkoers Overijse
2018
 2nd Primus Classic
 6th Grand Prix de Wallonie
 7th Overall Tour de Luxembourg
 8th Brabantse Pijl
 8th Grote Prijs Stad Zottegem
2019
 9th Druivenkoers Overijse

References

External links
 

1984 births
Living people
Dutch male cyclists
People from Wervershoof
Cyclists from North Holland